Don't Think Twice is an album by the American country music artist Waylon Jennings, released in 1970 on A&M Records. It consists of previously issued singles and a few unreleased recordings from his days at A&M during 1963-64. The title track, as well as "I Don't Believe You" are cover versions of Bob Dylan songs. Several of the other songs on the album are standards. "Just to Satisfy You", first recorded by Jennings in 1964, was re-recorded and issued on the 1969 RCA Victor Jennings album Just to Satisfy You.

Track listing
"Don't Think Twice, It's All Right" (Bob Dylan) – 3:00
"River Boy" (Fred Carter, Jr.) – 2:30
"Twelfth of Never" (Jerry Livingston, Paul Francis Webster) – 2:24
"The Race Is On" (Don Rollins) – 2:30
"Stepping Stone" (Smokey Stover) – 1:51
"The Real House of the Rising Sun" (Traditional) – 3:35
"Just to Satisfy You" (Don Bowman, Jennings) – 2:21
"Kisses Sweeter Than Wine" (Paul Campbell, Joel Newman) – 2:26
"Unchained Melody" (Alex North, Hy Zaret) – 3:12
"I Don't Believe You (She Acts Like We Never Have Met)" (Bob Dylan) – 4:00
"Four Strong Winds" (Ian Tyson) – 2:54

References

Waylon Jennings albums
1970 albums
A&M Records albums
Albums produced by Herb Alpert
Albums produced by Jerry Moss